The XM133 Minigun is a 6-barreled Gatling-type machine-gun. The weapon is a self-powered, gas-operated variant of the M134 Minigun. It fired over 3000 rpm but was not put into production.

The XM133 is a gas-operated machine-gun. It is nearly identical to the M134 but has barrels with ports that align with the piston drive in the center of the barrel cluster.

References

7.62×51mm NATO machine guns
Aircraft guns
Machine guns of the United States
Multi-barrel machine guns